Homoiousios ( from , hómoios, "similar" and , ousía, "essence, being") is a Christian theological term, coined in the 4th century by a distinctive group of Christian theologians who held the belief that God the Son was of a similar, but not identical, essence (or substance) with God the Father. Homoiousianism arose as an attempt to reconcile two opposite teachings, homoousianism and homoianism. Following Trinitarian doctrines of the First Council of Nicaea (325), homoousians believed that God the Son was of the same (homós, "same") essence with God the Father. On the other hand, homoians refused to use the term  (ousía, "essence"), believing that God the Father is "incomparable" and therefore the Son of God can not be described in any sense as "equal" or "same" but only as "like" or "similar" (hómoios) to the Father, in some subordinate sense of the term. In order to find a theological solution that would reconcile those opposite teachings, homoiousians tried to compromise between the essence-language of homoousians and the notion of similarity, held by homoians. Their attempt failed, and by the First Council of Constantinople (381) homoiousianism was already marginalized.

Proponents of this view included Eustathius of Sebaste and George of Laodicea.

Background
During the period of the development of Christian doctrine and refinement of Christian theological language which ran from AD 360 to 380, the controversy between Arianism and what would eventually come to be defined as catholic orthodoxy provoked an enormous burgeoning of new movements, sects and doctrines which came into existence in the attempt to stabilize and consolidate a unique and universal position on complex and subtle theological questions. One of the central questions concerned the nature of God and the fundamental character of his relationship with his Son Jesus Christ as the preexistent Logos. This controversy was called the "trinitarian controversy" because it involved solving the riddle of how it was possible that God the Father, His Son Jesus the Word, and the Holy Spirit could be one God. The dominant position among Christian theologians at this point in history was the doctrine of homoousianism, articulated and fiercely defended by Athanasius of Alexandria, according to which Father and Son were identical in essence, divine identity, attributes and energies, and that any deviations from this orthodoxy were to be considered heretical departures from apostolic faith and worship. The Homoians, however, had a powerful ally on their side in the person of Emperor Constantius II.

Doctrine
The Homoiousians took a stance between that of the Homoousians, and heteroousians such as Aëtius  and Eunomius. This compromise solution, which was satisfying to both the Homoians and the Homoiousians, deliberately set out to alienate the more extreme Neo-Arians. It was successful in this intent but it remained as illegitimate in the eyes of the pro-Nicenes as ever and Basil of Ancyra declared that "that which is like can never be the same as that to which it is like". On the other side, Constantius was becoming somewhat hostile to the influence of all of the new movements which had sprung up after the Nicene council. The result was that the Homoiousians disappeared from the stage of history and the struggle to define Church dogma became a two-sided battle between the Homoousians and the Homoians.

The term "homoiousios" was also preferred by many Origenists over the term "homoousios" because they felt it left "more room for distinctions in the Godhead". Another consideration may have been the association of the latter term with Paul of Samosata and with Gnosticism's Platonic chain of being.

References

Bibliography

External links 
 .

Christian movements
Christian terminology
Trinitarianism
Nature of Jesus Christ